Bogucin may refer to the following places in Poland:
Bogucin, Lower Silesian Voivodeship (south-west Poland)
Bogucin, Kuyavian-Pomeranian Voivodeship (north-central Poland)
Bogucin, Lublin Voivodeship (east Poland)
Bogucin, Ciechanów County in Masovian Voivodeship (east-central Poland)
Bogucin, Kozienice County in Masovian Voivodeship (east-central Poland)
Bogucin, Płońsk County in Masovian Voivodeship (east-central Poland)
Bogucin, Greater Poland Voivodeship (west-central Poland)
 Bogucin Duży in administrative district of Gmina Klucze, within Olkusz County, Lesser Poland Voivodeship (southern Poland)
 Bogucin Mały in administrative district of Gmina Olkusz, within Olkusz County, Lesser Poland Voivodeship (southern Poland)

See also
 Bogucino